Rahim Rashidi or Mr. Kurd (Kurdish: ڕەحیم ; born 1978ڕەشیدی) is an Iranian-Kurdish journalist and correspondent of Kurdistan TV and Kurdistan 24. He was born in 1978 in Markhoz village, Saqqez, Iran. In 2018, U.S. President Donald Trump nicknamed him Mr. Kurd for his active coverage of Kurds events in the Middle East and the fight against ISIS and his participation in White House news conferences and later, due to the impact of that nickname, he was named the “Man of the Year 2018” by the Washington Free Beacon online newspaper.

Biography
Rahim Rashidi started his career as a Peshmerga in Kurdistan Democratic Party (Iran). Than after that he became a human rights activist, writer, and journalist. For this reason he has been interviewed by many local and international media, press, radio and television agencies on local, and global political, historical, and social issues and affairs.

Activities
Rashidi began journalism in 1996 working for "Voice of Iranian Kurdistan" Radio and "Kurdistan" Newspaper. In 2004 he became a member of the editorial team of "Rêjwan" magazine in Sweden, publishing in Swedish and Kurdish.
From 2006 to 2010, Rahim was a member of the board of directors and the editor of the news department for Tishk TV, located in Paris, France.
Rashidi has been a member of the Swedish Union of Journalists and the International Federation of Journalists. He is currently a member of the Foreign Press Center (FPC) of the US State Department and a member of the Foreign Press Correspondents in the USA (AFPC-USA Club).
Additionally, Rashidi has been actively involved with the Kurdistan Human Rights Watch and the Leadership Council for Human Rights in the United States since 2010. He wrote an article “What do the Kurds Want and Why They are Oppressed” for the Contemporary Social Issues book, published in the United States in English and Persian.
At the present time he is the Chief Correspondent for Kurdistan24 and Kurdistan TV in Washington, DC. Mr. Kurd also oversees the operations of Zagros TV's Arabic section. Rashidi is also a member of the Gold Institute for International Strategy, and a consulting advisor to several companies and establishments in Washington, DC.

He has translated lot of literary, political, and social articles into Kurdish, including the following four books: 
 In Africa it's Always Midsummer 
 The Principles of a Democratic State, Peaceful and Civil Struggle
 Women's Rights
 Human Rights

See also
 List of nicknames used by Donald Trump

External links
 Interview with Mr. Rahim Rashidi about the elections in Iraqi Kurdistan in Persian.

Resources 

1978 births
Democratic Party of Iranian Kurdistan politicians
People from Saghez
Kurdish nationalists
Kurdish journalists
Iranian journalists
Living people